Main Zinda Hoon is a 1988 Indian Hindi-language drama film written and directed by Sudhir Mishra, starring Rajendra Gupta,  Pankaj Kapur, Deepti Naval and Alok Nath.

At the 36th National Film Awards, the film won the National Film Award for Best Film on Social Issues. The film was produced by  National Film Development Corporation of India (NFDC), which in 2012, included it in its film restoration project, which involved 80 Indian cinema classics.

Plot 
Beena is a village girl, who is married into a middle-class family in the city. However, her husband leaves her soon after wedding. She starts working and supports his family. Eventually, she falls in love with a co-worker. That is when her husband returns.

Cast 
 Deepti Naval as Beena
 Pankaj Kapur as Ravi
 Alok Nath as Alok
 Kulbhushan Kharbanda as Father
 Sushmita Mukherjee as Anjali
 Rajendra Gupta as Father-in-law
 Sarita Joshi as Mother-in-law

References

External links 
 
 

Indian drama films
Films about women in India
1980s Hindi-language films
Best Film on Other Social Issues National Film Award winners
Films directed by Sudhir Mishra
National Film Development Corporation of India films
1988 drama films
1988 films
Hindi-language drama films